Jon Jones (born 1987) is an American mixed martial artist.

Jon Jones may refer to

Jon Jones (director), British television director and screenwriter
Jon Owen Jones (born 1954), Welsh politician

See also
Jonathan Jones (disambiguation)
John Jones (disambiguation)